John Dave Schickerling (born 9 May 1995 in Calvinia, South Africa) is a South African rugby union player for the  in Super Rugby and  in the Currie Cup and in the Rugby Challenge. He regularly plays as a lock.

Career

Youth

As a scholar at Paarl Gimnasium, he earned a call-up to the  squad for the 2012 Under-18 Craven Week competition. At the completion of the Craven Week tournament, he was named in the South African Schools side that played a three-match tournament in August 2012. He started all three of South Africa's matches against France, Wales and England, helping South Africa to victories in all three matches.

He was once again named in the South Africa Schools side in 2013, but missed the matches through injury. He recovered to represent the  side during the 2013 Under-19 Provincial Championship, making two appearances.

In 2014, Schickerling was included in the South Africa Under-20 side that participated in the 2014 IRB Junior World Championship. After playing off the bench in their first match of the competition against Scotland, he got promoted to the starting line-up for their remaining pool stage matches against New Zealand and Samoa. He also started their semi-final match as they secured a second victory over New Zealand during the tournament and was also named in the run-on side for the final against England.

Western Province

He was out of the game for thirteen months, but returned to action for Western Province's Under-21s in October 2015 in their match against the s in Johannesburg.

South Africa 'A'

In 2016, Schickerling was included in a South Africa 'A' squad that played a two-match series against a touring England Saxons team. He was named in the starting line-up for their first match in Bloemfontein, but ended on the losing side as the visitors ran out 32–24 winners. He was named on the bench for the second match of the series, coming on as a second-half replacement in a 26–29 defeat to the Saxons in George.

References

External links
 

1995 births
Living people
People from Hantam Local Municipality
White South African people
South African rugby union players
Rugby union locks
Western Province (rugby union) players
South Africa Under-20 international rugby union players
Stormers players
Kobelco Kobe Steelers players
Rugby union players from the Northern Cape